Raynovtsi is a village in Gabrovo Municipality, in Gabrovo Province, in northern central Bulgaria.

In Bulgarian (Native transliteration): Село Райновци 
Other transliteration(s): Rainovci, Raynovtzi
Region: North-Central planning region of Bulgaria
District: Veliko Turnovo district
Municipality: Elena municipality
Latitude: 42.8833351
Longitude: 25.8500004
Altitude: from 500 to 699 
Distance by air to the capital city Sofia: 207.895km
Postal Code: 5094
Phone Code: 06713

References

Villages in Gabrovo Province